The Road to London is a 1921 American silent drama film directed by Eugene Mullin and starring Bryant Washburn, Saba Raleigh and Joan Morgan. Location shooting took place in London.

Synopsis
An American millionaire visiting London falls in love with a young aristocrat and elopes with her, pursued by a rival suitor.

Cast
 Bryant Washburn as Rex Rowland 
 Saba Raleigh as The Duchess 
 Gibb McLaughlin as The Count 
 Joan Morgan as The Lady Emily 
 George J. Folsey as Rex's Father 
 Rev. Dr. Batchelor as The Vicar 
 Bertran Hays as Captain of H.M.S. Olympic 
 Mabel Washburn as Maid

References

Bibliography
 Munden, Kenneth White. The American Film Institute Catalog of Motion Pictures Produced in the United States, Part 1. University of California Press, 1997.

External links

1921 films
1921 drama films
Silent American drama films
Films directed by Eugene Mullin
American silent feature films
1920s English-language films
American black-and-white films
Films set in London
Films shot in London
Associated Exhibitors films
1920s American films